Euconulus fulvus is a species of very small, air-breathing land snail, a terrestrial pulmonate gastropod mollusk in the family Euconulidae, the hive snails.

Description
For terms see gastropod shell

The 2.0-2.5 x 2.8-3.5 mm shell is broader than high. The colour is yellowish brown. The shell surface on the upper side is rather pale, the lower side is rather silky and smooth. There is no umbilicus and the last whorl with a trace of a keel.

Distribution 
This species occurs in countries and islands including:
 Czech Republic
 Ukraine
 Great Britain
 Ireland
 and other areas

Habitat
Euconulus fulvus occurs mainly in coniferous and deciduous forests, where it can be found in the litter or under deadwood pieces.
It can tolerate substrates which are non-calcareous.

References

External links
Euconulus fulvus at Animalbase taxonomy,short description, distribution, biology,status (threats), images 
  Euconulus fulvus  images at Encyclopedia of Life

Euconulidae
Gastropods described in 1774
Taxa named by Otto Friedrich Müller